Bohonagh is an axial stone circle located 2.4 km east of Rosscarbery, County Cork, Ireland. The circle is thought to date from the Bronze Age. A boulder burial is sited nearby (grid ref: 308 368).

Features
The stone circle comprised 13 stones set in a circle with a diameter of 30 ft. Four out of the 13 stones are missing and three were re-erected after excavation. Two portal stones are set radially on an east–west axis to the recumbent stones and are 240 cm high. At just under 8 ft, these stone are among the tallest of any Irish stone circle. The axis from these stones to the large axial-stone on the west side, points to sunset at the equinoxes. Many of the stones have quartz inclusions and many small pieces of quartz are associated with the circle.

A boulder burial is sited 20m east of the circle, and its large capstone (weighing almost 20 tons) has seven or more small cup-marks on the upper surface. Two of the three small supporting stones are of quartz and a fourth has been uprooted. A nearby loose slab also features cup-marks. The complex, which included a wooden house (which had been excavated) is of Bronze Age date.

Excavations
In 1959 the site was excavated and a central pit containing charcoal and cremated bone was found.

See also
 List of megalithic monuments in Cork

References

Sources
 McNally, Kenneth (2006). "Ireland's Ancient Stones" (Belfast: Appletree Press).

External links
Irish Megaliths - Photographs of Bohonagh
Megalithic Ireland - Photographs of Bohonagh Stone Circle
Irish Antiquities - Bohonagh Boulder Burial and Stone Circle

Stone circles in Ireland
Archaeological sites in County Cork
Rosscarbery